Presthope railway station was a station to the east of Hughley, Shropshire, England. The station was opened in 1867 and closed in 1951.

References

Further reading

Disused railway stations in Shropshire
Railway stations in Great Britain opened in 1867
Railway stations in Great Britain closed in 1951
Former Great Western Railway stations